Pasquale Giannattasio (15 January 1941 – 2 March 2002) was an Italian sprinter who won a gold medal in the 50 m at the 1967 European Indoor Games. He was part of the Italian 4 × 100 m relay team that finished seventh at the 1964 Summer Olympics. He won two gold medals with the national relay team at the Mediterranean Games in 1963 and 1967. He took part in 23 international competitions from 1963 to 1968.

National titles
Giannattasio won three national championships in a row at individual senior level.

Italian Athletics Championships
100 m: 1965, 1866, 1967 (3)

References

External links
 

1941 births
2002 deaths
Italian male sprinters
Olympic athletes of Italy
Athletics competitors of Fiamme Gialle
Athletes (track and field) at the 1964 Summer Olympics
Mediterranean Games gold medalists for Italy
Mediterranean Games silver medalists for Italy
Athletes (track and field) at the 1963 Mediterranean Games
Athletes (track and field) at the 1967 Mediterranean Games
Mediterranean Games medalists in athletics
Sportspeople from the Province of Salerno
Italian Athletics Championships winners
20th-century Italian people